For the 1977 Tour de France, to ride the Tour, teams had to pay money. The other Grand Tours, the Giro and the Vuelta, paid the teams money to start. For financial reasons, some teams chose to avoid the Tour, and only 100 cyclists started the race, divided in ten teams of ten cyclists each. One of the notable absentees was Michel Pollentier. The ten teams that did start the Tour were:
 Lejeune–BP
 Miko–Mercier–Hutchinson
 Peugeot–Esso–Michelin
 Kas–Campagnolo
 Frisol–Gazelle–Thirion
 Gitane–Campagnolo
 Teka
 Fiat
 Raleigh
 Bianchi–Campagnolo

Bernard Thévenet, the winner of 1975, was considered the main favourite, because the course of the race was considered suited to his talents. In March 1977, Thévenet had been penalized for a positive doping test in Paris–Nice.

The winner of the 1976 edition, Lucien Van Impe, was specialized in climbing, so his chances in the 1977 edition with less mountains were slimmer. Two other contenders were teammates Raymond Delisle and Joop Zoetemelk, fourth and second in the 1976 edition. Hennie Kuiper, the reigning world champion, was also a favourite.

Five-time winner Eddy Merckx was also competing, and was still considered an outsider for the victory, but he was no longer as dominant as before.

Start list

By team

By rider

By nationality

References

1977 Tour de France
1977